Inger Lise Rypdal (born 14 December 1949 in Lena, Norway) is a Norwegian singer and actress in many different genres: pop, rock, theater, film, and musical. She is the sister of singer Maj Britt Andersen and was married (1969–1985) to guitarist and composer Terje Rypdal.

Biography 
Inger Lise Rypdal (originally Inger Lise Andersen) has been an artist since 1968. She has made 16 albums in Norway and some in Sweden, acted in several theatre performances, nine movies and attended the Norwegian heats of the Eurovision Song Contest, the Melodi Grand Prix 10 times: 1969 ( as Inger Lise Andersen with Eventyr), 1972 (Lillebror), 1973 (with two songs: Alternativ, with Ola Neegaard, Gro Anita Schønn & Stein Ingebrigtsen Å for et spill), 1976 (with Jahn Teigen Voodoo), 1979 (Så lenge du er hos meg), 1980 (Svart fortid), 1981 (Tankar), 1982 (Lady Di), 1983 (with Freddy Berg Elegi), 1984 (Vindar). Together with Øystein Wiik she has done several musical concerts all around Norway.

She started with soul-music together with Geir Wentzel, and she has often returned to soul, for instance in the band Chipahua with some of the best Norwegian artists. In `La Mome Piaf` audience experienced Inger Lise Rypdal acting parts of Edith Piaf's life. All the well known songs were tied together with short stories from Piaf's life.

Discography

Solo albums 
Inger Lise (RCA, 1970) 
Hello-A (RCA, 1972) with Stein Ingebrigtsen
Sjung bort bekymren (RCA Sweden, 1972) 
Har du nånsinn... (RCA Sweden, 1973)
Fra 4 til 70 (Talent, 1973) (CD 1993)
830 S – bak sølvmikrofonen (Talent, 1974) with Stein Ingebrigtsen
Einar Schankes Gledeshus (Camp, 1974) 
Den stille gaten (Talent, 1974) 
Jag kommer tillbaka (RCA Sweden, 1975) 
Feeling (Talent, 1975) 
Tider kommer, tider går (Talent, 1977) 
Før og nå. 15 store suksesser 1973–79 (Talent, 1979) 
Inger Lise Rypdal (RCA Sweden, 1979) 
Sign Language (Talent, 1980) 
Songwriters for the Stars/Barry Mann & Cynthia Weill/David Foster (Mercury, 1982) 
Kontakt (Talent, 1982) 
Just For You (Studio B, 1983) 
Å, jul med din glede (Arco, 1986)
Till min kära (Studio B, 1987) 
Enkel resa (Sonet Sweden, 1988) .
Romanse (Agentus, 1988), with Lakki Patey
Fru Johnsen (Crema, 1989) 
Tid (Talent, 1997) 
Inger Lise (Master Music, 2001)
Ansikter (Kirkelig Kulturverksted, 2007), with Marius Rypdal

Albums featured 
With Terje Rypdal
Terje Rypdal (ECM, 1971)
After the Rain (ECM, 1976)

Melodi Grand Prix entries 
Eventyr (1969)
Lillebror(1972)
Å for et spill with Stein Ingebrigtsen, Ola Neegård, Gro Anita Schønn(1973)
Alternativ with Lillian Harriett (1975)
Yo-yo with Stein Ingebrigtsen(1974)
Voodoo with Jahn Teigen (1976)
Så lenge du er hos meg (1979)
Svart fortid (1980)
Tanker (1981)
Lady Di (1982)
Elegi with Freddy Dahl (1983)
Vinder (1984)

References

External links 
 
Music Information Center
Discography Norway
Home Page Inger Lise Rypdal (old)
Home Page Inger Lise Rypdal (New)

1949 births
Living people
Melodi Grand Prix contestants
Norwegian musical theatre actresses
Spellemannprisen winners
Norwegian film actresses
20th-century Norwegian women singers
20th-century Norwegian singers
21st-century Norwegian women singers
21st-century Norwegian singers
People from Østre Toten